Sajid Yousuf Dar is a former football player and is the former Head Coach of Senior Indian Women National Football Team and Indian Youth Football Teas (Boys). He is currently AIFF/AFC Coach Educator and Working as a Football Coach in University of Kashmir.During his playing days, Sajid represented Jammu and Kashmir in the Santosh Trophy from 2000 to 2002. He captained JK YMCA in Federation Cup in 1998. He is considered to be one of the best football coaches in the country. He holds the record for Winning two consecutive Silverwares, the Gold in South Asian Games and the SAFF CUP.He is son of international footballer Mohammad Yousuf Dar.

Playing career
Born in Jammu and Kashmir, Sajid in his early days started his career at local and school level. He made it to YMCA Football Club which used to be the aming the best teams in J and K.
He went on to play for YMCA in the Federation Cup and under his captaincy YMCA won many prestigious tournaments in 90,s. He also represented Jammu and Kashmir in the Junior Nationals and Santosh Trophy from 2000 to 2002. Sajid also played for JKSRTC Football Team and Iqbal Sports and was considered as one of the best defender in North Zone.

Coaching career
Currently Sajid is considered among top talented coach of a country with high potential. He began his coaching career in 2004 after completing his Diploma in Football from NSNIS Patiala. Soon after he was appointed as Football Coach in University of Kashmir. He was the Coach of JK U 21 Football Team. Soon after finishing his AFC A he was appointed as Assistant Coach of the preparation of India U19 side.
Sajid also was also oart of scouting team of AIFF in ealry days if his coaching career.
In 2012, Dar was appointed as Head Coach of U 14 National Football Team which participated in AFC Football Fedtival in Katmandu, Nepal and SAARC Football Championship in Tokyo Japan. He was appointed as head coach of the India U16 side bound for the 2017 FIFA U-17 World Cup when they were part of the AIFF Elite Academy.

In March 2015, Dar was selected to become the head coach of the India women's football team before their 2016 Summer Olympics qualifiers. His first match in charge of the side came on 13 March 2015 against Sri Lanka. His India side came out as 4–0 winners but a defeat to Myanmar in the next match ended India's hope of Olympic qualification.

2015: He was selected for the AFC instructors course in Malaysia by Asian football confederation and in the same year he attended ICC in Hennef, Germany conducted by the German Football Association in September .

2016: Sajid won his first trophy as India head coach as he led the country to gold in the 2016 South Asian Games. He got remarkable victory over Nepal 4–0 in the final.

2017: On 4 January, Sajid again emerged champion with India women's national team to clinch the 4th consecutive SAFF title. He also reamined Head Coach of U 19 Indian Womens National Team in AFC Qualifier held at Vietnam.

April 2017: Sajid ended his tenure as chief coach at a good note with a 2-0 victory over Hongkong at Pyongang, North Korea.

Sajid is also an AFC coach educator.

Statistics

Managerial statistics
.

Honours

Manager

India Women
SAFF Women's Championship: 2016
South Asian Games Gold medal: 2016
 Gold medal in U 17 Adminstator Cup in 2013
 Winner of U 19 I League West Zone in 2013
 Awarded best coach of the year 2014 by J and K Govt

References

External links
 All India Football Federation Profile
 

Living people
Footballers from Jammu and Kashmir
Indian footballers
Indian football managers
India women's national football team managers
Association footballers not categorized by position
Year of birth missing (living people)